Dorian  Keletela (born 6 February 1999) is a Congolese-born refugee sprinter.

Life 
Born in the Republic of the Congo in 1999, Keletela came to Portugal in 2016 fleeing the conflict in Congo. Aged 17 he spent over a year in refugee centres, and set about learning a new language and adapting to a new way of life. He has been training with Sporting Clube de Portugal in Lisbon. He ran a 6.79s second 60m in February 2020, and a 10.46s 100m in August 2020.

Whilst competing as one of 29 athletes across 12 disciplines representing the IOC refugee Olympic team at the 2020 Tokyo Olympics, Keletela ran a personal best 10.33 seconds for the 100 metres to win his preliminary heat.

Competitions

References

1999 births
Living people
Republic of the Congo male sprinters
Republic of the Congo emigrants to Portugal
Portuguese sportspeople of African descent
Athletes (track and field) at the 2020 Summer Olympics
Refugee Olympic Team at the 2020 Summer Olympics